You Gotta Go There to Come Back is the fourth studio album by alternative rock band Stereophonics. Produced by Kelly Jones and released on V2 in 2003, this LP became their third consecutive album to top the UK chart, selling 101,946 copies in its first week alone. It is the final Stereophonics album to feature long-time original drummer Stuart Cable before he was fired in September 2003.

Recording
Kelly Jones produced the album himself, working fast in hoping to capture the "vibe" of the band's concerts; "I wanted to create a record that was very raw, very spontaneous but had loads of detail and textures and layers," Jones noted, "We pushed ourselves in many places we've never been before." He later recalled that recording the album was, for many years, the best recording experience the band ever had, saying: "All the crew were in the room, all the girlfriends were in the room, all the band were there, it was the best recording session ever. It just felt like a fucking really good time."

Musical and lyrical style
You Gotta Go There to Come Back features a blues rock styled sound in the mold of early 1970s rock bands, and also displays influences of garage rock and soul. Kelly Jones described the album, with its "very 70s, Stevie Wonder, rock overdub feel", as the fulfillment of his desire to make an album like his favourite soul music: "I was really into soul music - it's not something I'm ashamed about. I was brought up on Stevie Wonder and I love Talking Book and all the overdubs on it, and all that freestyling Marvin Gaye thing. I'd always wanted to make a record like that, and this was the first one I produced so that's probably why I went 'Fuck it I'm just going to do it'." The NME felt that the album's "retro-garage" style made it "accidentally hip," comparing it to acclaimed contemporary garage rock revival "headbanger blues" bands like the White Stripes, a sentiment also shared by music critic Neil McCormick.

Throughout the album there are "different moods and changes." Jones stated: "Every few bars, when your brain's saying, 'Have you heard that now', I wanted to put something new in there." He felt this set the album apart from most other contemporary albums, which he felt "sound like one song from beginning to end." Jack Smith of the BBC detected influences from AC/DC, Stevie Wonder, the Isley Brothers and Creedence Clearwater Revival. The album also sporadically features "ornate strings reminiscent of Chris Farlowe's British soul in the 1960s." Jones' emotional lyrics for the albums draw on his break-up with his girlfriend of 12 years, and one critic noted how Jones' "life unfolds through words" on the album. Jones said of the lyrics:

The opening song, "Help Me (She's Out of Her Mind)", has been described as "easy funk", and comparisons were drawn between Jones' vocals on the song and John Lennon's "Cold Turkey" vocals. Jason MacNeil of PopMatters compared the "moody, murky blues rock" song to Southern soul, while describing "Maybe Tomorrow" as "English soul." Lead single "Madame Helga" has been described as gospel and glam metal, with "dirty guitars duplicating a funky brass section." The acoustic, country-styled "Climbing the Wall" features horn and string sections and a Southern rock guitar solo, while the "pseudo-experimentalism" of "I'm Alright (You Gotta Go There To Come Back)" features looped drums and a piano. The quieter "Rainbows and Pots of Gold" has soul influences and concerns "a friend who stole [Jones'] girl."

Reception

Critical response
You Gotta Go There to Come Back received generally mixed reviews. At Metacritic, which assigns a weighted average rating out of 100 to reviews from mainstream critics, the album received an average score of 60 based on 10 reviews.

Commercial performance
You Gotta Go There to Come Back joined its predecessors at #1 on release. It was re-issued with bonus tracks in February 2004, coming into the UK charts again at #35, finally re-entering at #16 in September 2004. It was the 28th biggest selling album of 2003 in the UK. The track "Maybe Tomorrow" became one of their biggest hits; it was played over the credits of the Academy Award-winning movie Crash (2004) and also during the opening scene of the film Wicker Park (2004). It was also used in a season one episode of One Tree Hill and featured on the first Charmed soundtrack.

Track listing

Bonus tracks
The track "Moviestar" appears on later editions of the album as track 4 and was released with a DVD containing the videos for the singles.

Vinyl editions

The album was released in gatefold sleeve at first, containing two records. When "Moviestar" was included on the album the gatefold sleeve contained three records.

Personnel

Stereophonics
 Kelly Jones – lead vocals, guitar, keyboards, harmonica, Clavinet, Fender Rhodes, Mellotron, Wurlitzer
 Richard Jones – bass guitar, harmonica
 Stuart Cable – drums, percussion

Technical
 Production – Kelly Jones, Jim Lowe
 Engineering – Andy Burden, Jim Lowe, Steve McNichol, Chris Steffenl, Brian Vibberts
 Mixing – Kelly Jones, Jim Lowe, Jack Joseph Puig
 Mastering – Dick Beetham, Chris Blair
 Digital editing – Steve McNichol
 Studio assistants – Chris Bolster, Andy Davies, Max Dingle, Javier Weyler

Additional
 Tony Kirkham – mellotron, piano, clavinet, Hammond organ, Fender Rhodes, Wurlitzer organ
 Javier Weyler – hand clapping, percussion
 Jim Lowe – mellotron, piano
 Stephen Papworth – hand clapping, kettle drums, percussion
 Paul Spong – cornet, flugelhorn
 Backing vocalists – Angie Brown, Sam Brown, Sam Leigh Brown, Melanie Marcus, Aileen McLaughlin, Anna Ross

Orchestra
 Strings – Mark Berrow, Rachel Bolt, Ben Chappell, Gustav Clarkson, David Daniel, David Daniels, Patrick Kiernan, Boguslaw Kostecki, Peter Lale, Paddy Lannigan, Julian Leaper, Rita Manning, Perry Mason, Anthony Pleeth, Mary Scully, Katherine Shave, Chris Tobling, Bruce White, Gavyn Wright, Naomi Wright
 Alto Sax – Steve Hamilton
 Cornet and flugelhorn – Paul Spong
 Tenor sax – Andy Hamilton
 Trombone – Neil Sidwell
 Trumpet – Sid Gauld

Charts

Weekly charts

Year-end charts

References

External links
You Gotta Go There To Come Back at stereophonics.com

Stereophonics albums
2003 albums
V2 Records albums